Turkish Women at the Bath is an album by drummer Pete La Roca which features saxophonist John Gilmore and pianist Chick Corea. It was recorded in 1967 and was originally released on the Douglas label.

The album was rereleased in 1973 on Muse Records under Corea's name as Bliss!, but was withdrawn after legal action by La Roca.

Reception

The AllMusic review by Scott Yanow commented: "it was actually drummer Pete La Roca's date, and he contributes seven now-forgotten but quite intriguing originals. But of greatest interest is the playing of tenor saxophonist John Gilmore, heard during one of his few excursions away from Sun Ra. Fine advanced hard bop". On All About Jazz, Jim Santella noted Turkish Women at the Bath is based on the painting by Jean-Auguste-Dominique Ingres, offering inspiration for each of LaRoca's seven compositions. The drummer, as leader, drives the rhythm and surrounds his quartet with shimmering cymbals".

Track listing 
All compositions by Pete La Roca.
 "Turkish Women at the Bath" – 5:14
 "Dancing Girls" – 5:50
 "Love Planet" – 5:28
 "Marjoun" – 3:34
 "Bliss" – 4:58
 "Sin Street" – 7:00
 "And So" – 1:21
 "And So" – 1:45

Note: original LP track durations listed. Some versions contain an alternate sequencing.

Personnel 
Pete La Roca – drums 
John Gilmore – tenor saxophone
Chick Corea – piano
Walter Booker - bass

References 

Pete La Roca albums
1967 albums
Muse Records albums